Frederick Lewis Allen (July 5, 1890 – February 13, 1954) was the editor of Harper's Magazine and also notable as an American historian of the first half of the twentieth century.  His specialty was writing about recent and popular history.

Life

Allen was born in Boston, Massachusetts.  He studied at Groton, graduated from Harvard University in 1912 and received his Master's in 1913. He taught at Harvard briefly thereafter before becoming assistant editor of the Atlantic Monthly in 1914, and then managing editor of The Century in 1916. He began working for Harper's in 1923, becoming editor-in-chief in 1941, a position he held until shortly before his death, aged 63, in New York City. His wife, Dorothy Penrose Allen (née Cobb, a first cousin of Ambassador Ellsworth Bunker), died just prior to the 1931 publication of his best-known book, Only Yesterday.

He died on February 13, 1954, and is buried in lot 395, section 7 of Forest Hills Cemetery in Jamaica Plain.

Works

Allen's popularity coincided with increased interest in history among the book-buying public of the 1920s and 1930s.  This interest was met, not by the university-employed historian, but by an amateur historian writing in his free time. Aside from Allen, these historians included Carl Sandburg, Bernard DeVoto, Douglas Southall Freeman, Henry F. Pringle, and Allan Nevins (before his Columbia appointment).

His most famous book was the enormously popular Only Yesterday (1931), which chronicled American life in the 1920s. Since Yesterday (1939), a sort of sequel that covered the Depression of the 1930s, was also a bestseller. The 1933 Hollywood film Only Yesterday was ostensibly based on his book, but actually used only its timeline, with a fictional plot adapted from a Stefan Zweig novel.

He wrote the introduction to Mabel S. Ulrich's collection of essays by notable woman writers of the day, including Mary Borden, Margaret Culkin Banning, Sylvia Townsend Warner, Susan Ertz, E. M. Delafield, Rebecca West, Isabel Paterson and Storm Jameson, The More I See Of Men (Harper & Brothers, 1932).

His last and most ambitious book, The Big Change, was a social history of the United States from 1900 to 1950. (He had originally written a Harper's article about how America had changed between 1850 and 1950, but decided to limit the chronological scope of his book.) Allen also wrote two biographies, the first of which was about Paul Revere Reynolds, a literary agent of the era. This work is notable because it contains a chapter about Stephen Crane, but is difficult to find because it was privately published.

In 1950, Allen was one of five narrators for the RKO Radio Pictures documentary film, The Golden Twenties, produced by Time, Inc.

Recognition

The Frederick Lewis Allen Room in the New York Public Library was established by the Ford Foundation in 1958. It is Room 228e on the second floor of the library. Admission is limited to writers under book contract to a publishing company.

Allen's son, Oliver Ellsworth, also worked in journalism with a stint at Life magazine.

Bibliography
 (history)
 (history, biography, economics)
 (history)
 (biography)
 (travel)
 (biography)
 (history)

Notes

References

External links 

Only Yesterday  hypertext from American Studies at the University of Virginia.
Since Yesterday online from Universal Digital Library.
 Works by Frederick Lewis Allen at Project Gutenberg Australia

Historians of the United States
20th-century American historians
American male non-fiction writers
1890 births
1954 deaths
Groton School alumni
The Harvard Lampoon alumni
Harvard University alumni
People from Boston
Historians from Massachusetts
20th-century American male writers